Aechmea recurvata is a plant species in the genus Aechmea. This species is native to southern Brazil, Paraguay, Uruguay and northern Argentina.

Varieties
Three varieties are recognized:

Aechmea recurvata var. benrathii (Mez) Reitz - Santa Catarina
Aechmea recurvata var. ortgiesii (Baker) Reitz - São Paulo
Aechmea recurvata var. recurvata - most of species range

Cultivars
The species is widely cultivated as an ornamental. Many cultivars are recorded, including

References

recurvata
Flora of South America
Plants described in 1856